Q.E.D. (quod erat demonstrandum, Latin for "that which was to be demonstrated") was the name of a series of BBC popular science documentary films which aired in the United Kingdom from 1982 to 1999.

Format
Running in a half-hour peak-time slot on the BBC's primary mass-audience channel BBC1, the series had a more populist and general interest agenda than the long-running Horizon series which aired on the more specialist channel BBC2.

Horizon could often be difficult for a scientific novice, requiring a modicum of background knowledge beyond the reaches of many viewers, so Q.E.D. was a more approachable way of introducing scientific stories.

Some notable films
 A Guide to Armageddon (1982) – the effects of a one megaton nuclear bomb being exploded over London. Director Mick Jackson went on to direct the 1984 docu-drama Threads, an account of a nuclear holocaust and its effect on the working class city of Sheffield, England, and the eventual long-term effects of nuclear war on civilization.
 Simon's War (1983) – the life of Simon Weston, who suffered serious burns in the Falklands War.
 Big Brother's Little Test (1983) – How reliable is polygraphy, the use of lie-detectors? Can the innocent be unjustly condemned? Can the guilty beat them?
 In at the Deep End (1984) – an experiment in which divers spent nine days at simulated depths of up to 1000 feet, breathing a mixture of hydrogen and oxygen.
 Round Britain Whizz (1986) – a sped-up flight around the coastline of Britain, with guest appearances of Patrick Moore, David Bellamy and Clay Jones.
 The Foolish Wise Ones (1987) – a look at the talents and worlds of Autistic Savants, such as Stephen Wiltshire.
 With a Goal in Mind (1988) – A sport psychologist works with First Division Queen's Park Rangers for a period of six weeks.
 The Magic of Memory (1988) – fronted by the TV magician Paul Daniels, who among other things uses the Linkword system to master enough Spanish to present the second part of the programme in the language.
 Glimpses of Death (1988) - Prof. Peter Fenwick takes a look (at that time still very pioneering) at the phenomenon of near-death experiences. 
 John's Not Mad (1989) – follows a 15-year-old boy with severe Tourette syndrome.
 My Best Friend's a Computer (1990) – explores the effects of computers on the emotional development of children.
 How to be Happy (1996) - about the science and psychology of happiness, presented by Robert Holden. 
 Nerve Transplant (1997) – explores the work  of a unique nerve transplant surgeon, bringing back movement to the limbs of previously paralysed patients.
 Superspecs (1997) – follows the travels of a British inventor around Ghana with a pair of glasses made for just a dollar, that he is convinced could save the sight of millions.
 The Burning Question (1998) – on spontaneous human combustion.
 Breathless (1998) – investigates the Buteyko method for treating asthma.

See also
 Equinox – Channel 4 popular science series, last aired in 2001
 Horizon – comparable BBC2 strand, on air since 1964
 Nova – documentary series on PBS in the United States, which often bought in and re-voiced Equinox and Horizon films

References

External links
 Q.E.D., British Film Institute.  List of films, with dates.
 

1982 British television series debuts
1999 British television series endings
BBC television documentaries about science
Documentary television series about technology
Popular science
Science education in the United Kingdom
1980s British documentary television series
1990s British documentary television series